Patricia Russell, Countess Russell (1910 – 2004) was the third wife of philosopher Bertrand Russell and a significant contributor to his book A History of Western Philosophy.

Lady Russell was born Marjorie Helen Spence in 1910. As her parents had always wanted a boy, she was known as 'Peter', a nickname she retained throughout her life.  She met Bertrand Russell in 1930 when she was a 21-year-old undergraduate at the University of Oxford, hired by Russell's second wife Dora Black as a governess. They had an affair and were married at the Midhurst register office on 18 January 1936. They had one son, Conrad Sebastian Robert Russell, 5th Earl Russell, who became a prominent historian and one of the leading figures in the Liberal Democrat party. They had an acrimonious separation in 1949.

Patricia was a member of the first board of the Harlow Development Corporation, serving from 1947 to 1950. She smoked a pipe.

Notes

References
 Ray Monk, Bertrand Russell. The Ghost of Madness, London 2000
Gibberd, Frederick et al. Harlow : the story of a new town. Stevenage: Publications for Companies. 1980.

External links
  Details of 12 portraits, 8 of them reproduced

Bertrand Russell
1910 births
2004 deaths
British countesses